Lloyd England Hall is a historic building at the northwest corner of 6th and Missouri Streets, on the grounds of Camp Joseph T. Robinson, an Arkansas National Guard base in North Little Rock, Arkansas.  It is a Spanish Revival structure, designed by the Little Rock architectural firm of Thompson, Sanders, and Ginnochio, and built in 1931, when the facility was known as Camp Pike.  Originally built as an auditorium and meeting hall, it is now home to the Arkansas National Guard Museum.

The building was listed on the National Register of Historic Places in 1997.

See also
National Register of Historic Places listings in Pulaski County, Arkansas
List of museums in Arkansas

References

External links
 Arkansas National Guard Museum

Government buildings on the National Register of Historic Places in Arkansas
Mission Revival architecture in Arkansas
Art Deco architecture in Arkansas
Government buildings completed in 1931
Buildings and structures in North Little Rock, Arkansas
Museums in Pulaski County, Arkansas
Arkansas National Guard
Military and war museums in Arkansas
National Register of Historic Places in Pulaski County, Arkansas
National Guard (United States) museums